A Place in the World is a 1979 Australian mini series about a school reunion.

References

External links
A Place in the World at IMDb

1979 Australian television series debuts
1979 Australian television series endings
1970s Australian television miniseries
1979 films
Films directed by Chris Thomson (director)